Orso Orsini (died 1485) was a Roman Catholic prelate who served as Bishop of Terni (1485).

Biography
In 1485, Orso Orsini was appointed by Pope Sixtus IV as Bishop of Terni. 
He served as Bishop of Terni until his death in 1485.

References

External links and additional sources
 (for Chronology of Bishops) 
 (for Chronology of Bishops) 

15th-century Italian Roman Catholic bishops
Year of birth unknown
1485 deaths
Bishops appointed by Pope Sixtus IV